Dasnice is a municipality and village in Sokolov District in the Karlovy Vary Region of the Czech Republic. It has about 300 inhabitants.

Notable people
Johann Böhm (born 1937), German politician

References

Villages in Sokolov District